In Hindu mythology the Angiris (or Angiras)  are a group of celestial beings who are descendants of the Fire God Agni and the Goddess Agneya, responsible for watching over humans performing Yagna (sacrifices) and protecting the sacrificial fires

Notes

References
 

Hindu deities